The 1991 Pan American Women's Handball Championship was the third edition of the Pan American Women's Handball Championship, held in Brazil from 30 September to 6 October 1990. It acted as the American qualifying tournament for the 1992 Summer Olympics.

Preliminary round
All times are local (UTC−3).

Group A

Group B

Placement round
Points from the first round were carried over.

Final round
Points from the first round were carried over.

Final ranking

External links
Results on todor66.com

1991 Women
American Women's Handball Championship
Pan
1990 in Brazilian sport
September 1990 sports events in South America
October 1990 sports events in South America